Southern Pacific Company's MM-2 class of steam locomotives was Southern Pacific's (SP) only class of 2-6-6-2 locomotives ordered and built as oil-fired cab forward locomotives. They were built in 1911 as compound-expansion Mallet locomotives by Baldwin Locomotive Works and entered service on SP beginning September 19, 1911. By 1914, they had all been upgraded with an additional leading axle making them 4-6-6-2 locomotives, reclassified from MM-2 to AM-2. This was done to improve handling at speed. These locomotives were the predecessors of several other cab-forward engines, culminating in the AC-12 class cab forward locomotives built during World War II.

SP used these locomotives in the Sierra Nevada for about 20 years, retiring them in the mid-1930s.

The rebuilt locomotives were renumbered into the 3900 series then used on SP's Portland Division in Oregon until they were again retired in the late 1940s.  The locomotives were all scrapped soon after retirement with the last, 3907 (originally 4207), on September 23, 1948.

References 
 

MM-2
2-6-6-2 locomotives
4-6-6-2 locomotives
Baldwin locomotives
Mallet locomotives
Steam locomotives of the United States
Railway locomotives introduced in 1911
Scrapped locomotives
Standard gauge locomotives of the United States